Jordan Nassar (born 1985) is an American artist based in New York City. He primarily works with textiles, especially in creating works based on traditional Palestinian embroidery. Nassar also creates self-published artist's books and zines.

Early life
Nassar was born in 1985 in New York City's Upper West Side, where he also grew up. He is the son of a Polish mother and of a U.S.-born Palestinian doctor who performs humanitarian work in Palestine. His father's father, a Jordanian Palestinian, came to the United States as a teenager.

Career
Nassar bases his work on tatreez (Palestinian cross-stitch embroidery) which is typically created in panels which are stitched together into clothing or other items. Nassar typically creates and frames small panels, many around 8 x 10 inches. The panels' patterns typically feature geometric borders and depict plants and flowers, though the thread colors Nassar uses often do not correspond to those shapes, but to subtle landscapes. Nassar's work depicts cultural elements of his upbringing in the Upper West Side, which he likens to traditional Palestinian embroidery, where each village uses distinct symbols. Some designs also feature technology-related motifs, such as computers, which Nassar links with embroidery as the first form of pixelation.

Nassar's earliest work involved copying embroidery patterns from books. Once he learned that each Palestinian village has its own pattern, he began to develop his own patterns resembling Palestinian embroidery but that do not exist in traditional works. Each work contains up to 75,000 individual stitches.

Nassar draws inspiration from a number of artists, many of whom work in textile, such as Sheila Hicks, Hannah Ryggen, and Anni Albers; painters including Paul Guiragossian and Helen Frankenthaler; and artists working with alternative media, such as Monir Shahroudy Farmanfarmaian. He sees his work as continuing the conversations their artwork has created. He considers their efforts to be about form, texture, and color, though Nassar primarily tries to address concepts and issues beyond the medium itself. Nassar particularly looks up to Etel Adnan, a Lebanese-American poet, essayist, and visual artist.

Since Nassar's first solo exhibition, in London in 2015, he has turned to creating more political works, including focusing on cultural absorption, or absorption of elements of one culture by another.

Nassar held a solo exhibition in Los Angeles at Anat Ebgi gallery's AE2 space in 2017. Anat Ebgi presented Nassar's work at the 2018 Frieze New York, an art fair in New York City.

In addition to Nassar's embroidery, he also has had managerial positions at the New York City artists book shop Printed Matter, Inc., running the NY Art Book Fair and the art fair Art Los Angeles Contemporary.

Artist residency
Nassar started expanding the use of traditional symbols in his work upon spending significant time in the port city of Jaffa, where he stayed for a five-week artist residency in 2017. Arab and Israeli friends, as well as Nassar's husband had advised against the residency, due to the organization's acceptance of financing from supporters of illegal Jewish settlements in Palestine. Nassar decided that boycotting the program would not be impactful, and was impressed that the residency's website was inclusive through its Arabic, Hebrew, and English language versions. The residency included an apartment, studio, stipend, and reimbursement of production funds. Nassar used the funds to visit the West Bank, where he purchased embroideries made by elderly women.

Personal life
Jordan Nassar is married to the Israeli-born fellow artist Amir Guberstein. The two met while living in Berlin, and their decision to live in New York was spurred by the ruling in United States v. Windsor, the Supreme Court case that overturned the Defense of Marriage Act.

Nassar lives and works in New York City.

Exhibitions
Solo exhibitions:

 "Fantasy And Truth”, ICA / Institute for Contemporary Art Boston (2022)
 “To Light The Sky”, James Cohan Gallery, New York City (2022)
 "A Sun To Come", Anat Ebgi Gallery, Los Angeles (2022)
 "I Cut The Sky In Two", James Cohan Gallery, New York City (2020)
 "We Are The Ones To Go To The Mountain", Anat Ebgi Gallery, Los Angeles (2020)
 "Night", ADAA: The Art Show with James Cohan Gallery, New York City (2020)
 "The Sea Beneath Our Eyes", The Center for Contemporary Art, Tel Aviv (2019)
 "Between Sky And Earth", Princeton Art Museum, New Jersey (2019)
 "For Your Eyes", The Third Line, Dubai (2019)
 "Spirits Rebellious", Frieze Art Fair (New York) with Anat Ebgi Gallery (2018)
 "Dunya", Anat Ebgi, Los Angeles (2017)
 "Jaffa: New Works", Artport Tel Aviv (2017)
 "No Secret with Mika Horibuchi", LVL3 Gallery, Chicago (2016)
 "And a Night", Evelyn Yard, London (2015)

He was recently included in group exhibitions at the Whitney Museum of American Art, Katonah Museum of Art, the Laband Art Gallery at Loyola Marymount University, the Abrons Art Center, and Supportico Lopez in Berlin.

See also
 Islamic embroidery
 Palestinian handicrafts
 Palestinian Americans

References

External links
 Personal website

1958 births
21st-century American male artists
American people of Palestinian descent
American people of Polish descent
Artists from New York City
American LGBT artists
LGBT people from New York (state)
People from the Upper West Side
Living people
American embroiderers